Mark Oliver Everett (born April 10, 1963) is the American lead singer, songwriter, guitarist, keyboardist and sometimes drummer of the rock band Eels. Also known as E, he is known for writing songs tackling subjects such as death, loneliness, divorce, childhood innocence, depression, and unrequited love, often from personal experience.

Early life
Everett is the son of physicist Hugh Everett III, originator of the many-worlds interpretation of quantum theory. Mark's maternal grandfather was Harold "Kid" Gore, a men's basketball, football and baseball coach at the University of Massachusetts-Amherst.

When Everett was in his early teens, an incident occurred while he was attending a concert by English rock band the Who. A special effects laser struck Everett directly in the eye and, as a result, he has needed to wear glasses ever since.

Everett's father died of a heart attack when Everett was 19. Mark was the one to find him. Everett later made a documentary about his father's theory and his relationship with his father entitled Parallel Worlds, Parallel Lives for the BBC that was aired on the PBS series NOVA in 2008.

Music career

E
In 1987, Everett moved from his family home in Virginia and resettled in California. There, Everett began his professional musical career with two major-label albums: A Man Called E (1992) and Broken Toy Shop (1993). The pseudonym "E" was used for both of these early recordings. He became known as "E" because there were several people in his life at the time who had the same first name.

Eels

In 1995, Everett formed the band Eels in Los Angeles. Their studio albums include Beautiful Freak (1996), Electro Shock Blues (1998), Daisies of the Galaxy (2000), Souljacker (2001), Shootenanny! (2003), Blinking Lights and Other Revelations (2005), Hombre Lobo: 12 Songs of Desire (2009), End Times (2010), Tomorrow Morning (2010), Wonderful, Glorious (2013), The Cautionary Tales of Mark Oliver Everett (2014), The Deconstruction (2018), Earth to Dora (2020) and Extreme Witchcraft (2022). Hombre Lobo, End Times and Tomorrow Morning form a trilogy, focusing on "lust, loss and redemption".

In film

Everett's music has been featured in a number of films, including American Beauty ("Cancer for the Cure"), Road Trip ("Mr. E's Beautiful Blues"), Dr. Seuss' How the Grinch Stole Christmas ("Christmas is Going to the Dogs"), Holes ("Eyes Down," "Mighty Fine Blues"), Shrek ("My Beloved Monster"), Shrek 2 ("I Need Some Sleep"), Shrek the Third ("Royal Pain" and "Losing Streak"), Shrek the Halls ("The Stars Shine in the Sky Tonight"), Hellboy II: The Golden Army ("Beautiful Freak"), Henry Poole is Here ("Love of the Loveless"), The Big White ("Last Stop: This Town"), Hot Fuzz ("Souljacker, pt.1"), The Big Year ("I Like Birds"), as well as most of the music in Yes Man. Additionally, his song "Fresh Blood" (off Hombre Lobo) forms the music played over the credits of HBO's The Jinx.

Everett plays an acoustic version of the Eels song "What I Have to Offer" in a deleted scene from This Is 40 (2012) and follows his performance by telling Rudd's record executive character that the band has decided to sign a contract with a competing label.

Other works
Although he has denied it, Everett is suspected of working under the alias MC Honky, who released the album I Am the Messiah in 2003.

The 2007 BBC Scotland / BBC Four television documentary Parallel Worlds, Parallel Lives followed Everett as he talked to physicists and his father's former colleagues about his father's theory. The documentary won a Royal Television Society award on March 19, 2008. The documentary was shown in lieu of a support act during their UK, US, Irish and Australian tours in the spring of 2008. In the U.S., the PBS program Nova broadcast the documentary in October 2008.

In November 2007, Everett published his autobiography, entitled Things the Grandchildren Should Know.

On February 19, 2016, Everett appeared as Brian in Season 1, Episode 4 ("A Party in the Hills") of Judd Apatow's Love, playing a cover of Paul McCartney's song "Jet". He also briefly appeared in Season 1, Episode 9, Season 2, Episode 2 and Season 3, Episode 6. He had a small cameo in Bill & Ted Face the Music (2020). He has a brief cameo with his dog in the opening sequence of Ant-Man and the Wasp: Quantumania.

Personal life
Everett's sister, Elizabeth, took her own life in 1996, and in 1998, his mother, Nancy Everett (née Gore), was diagnosed with terminal lung cancer. The lyrics of Eels' second album, Electro-Shock Blues, focused extensively on these events.

In 2000, Everett married Natalia Kovaleva, a Russian dentist he met near Hamburg, Germany. The marriage ended after five years. Following Eels' tour accompanying their album The Cautionary Tales of Mark Oliver Everett, Everett took a break from music. During this period, he met and married a Scottish woman employed in the film industry. At the age of 54, Everett became a father for the first time when his wife gave birth to their son, Archie McGregor Everett. The couple, however, divorced some time later.

Everett's cousin, Jennifer Lewis (née Gore), was a flight attendant who perished on American Airlines Flight 77, the plane that struck the Pentagon during the September 11, 2001 attacks. The plane struck the side of the Pentagon where his father had worked, and Everett remarks in his autobiography that he wonders whether the plane hit his father's old office.

In July 2014, Everett was given the Freedom of the City of London, at a ceremony held prior to his concert at the Barbican Centre.

Everett has described himself as an agnostic, but has also explicitly used language thanking God.

References

External links
Healy, Pat, "‘Nova’ came for his soul: Eels front man on the healing power of a science doc about his dad", Metro newspaper, October 21, 2008.
FLYP Media, "Interactive profile on Eels songwriter, about his memoir", November 25, 2008.

 
1963 births
American male singers
Record producers from California
American rock drummers
American rock guitarists
American male guitarists
American rock keyboardists
American rock singers
DreamWorks Records artists
Living people
Singers from Virginia
Polydor Records artists
American multi-instrumentalists
American memoirists
Guitarists from Los Angeles
Guitarists from Virginia
21st-century American male actors
Actors from Virginia
Writers from Virginia
21st-century American guitarists
21st-century American singers
20th-century American singers
20th-century American guitarists
20th-century American writers
21st-century American non-fiction writers
Alternative rock guitarists
Alternative rock singers
Singers from Los Angeles
Writers from Los Angeles
20th-century American drummers
American male drummers
21st-century American drummers
American agnostics
People from Los Feliz, Los Angeles